Thomas Daly may refer to:
Thomas Mayne Daly (1852–1911), member of the Canadian House of Commons and cabinet minister from Manitoba
Thomas Mayne Daly Sr. (1827–1885), his father, member of the Canadian House of Commons from Ontario
Thomas Daly (Irish politician), member of the Northern Ireland Assembly
Thomas Aquinas Daly (born 1937), American contemporary landscape and still life painter
Thomas Daly (Alberta politician) (1861–1908), municipal councillor in Edmonton, Alberta
Thomas Daly (cricketer) (1847–1887), Australian cricketer
Thomas Daly (general) (1913–2004), Australian soldier, Chief of the General Staff, 1966–1971

Thomas Anthony Daly (born 1960), Bishop of Spokane

See also
Tom Daly (disambiguation)
Tom Daley (disambiguation)
Thomas Vose Daily (1927–2017), Catholic bishop